Bruno Hübner (1899–1983) was an Austrian film and television actor known for his work in Germany. He was born in Reichenberg then in the Austro-Hungarian Empire, which later became part of Czechoslovakia.

Selected filmography
 Punks Arrives from America (1935)
 Under Blazing Heavens (1936)
 A Wedding Dream (1936)
 Patriots (1937)
 The Broken Jug (1937)
 Such Great Foolishness (1937)
 The Mountain Calls (1938)
 Maria Ilona (1939)
 The Green Emperor (1939)
 Falstaff in Vienna (1940)
 Bismarck (1940)
 The Rothschilds (1940)
 The Fox of Glenarvon (1940)
 Counterfeiters (1940)
 The Rainer Case (1942)
 Nora (1944)
 The Millionaire (1947)
 The Lost Face (1948)
 Friday the Thirteenth (1949)
 Doctor Praetorius (1950)
 A Devil of a Woman (1951)
 My Name is Niki (1952)
 The Great Temptation (1952)
 Knall and Fall as Detectives (1953)
 Fanfare of Marriage (1953)
 A Girl from Paris (1954)
 Annie from Tharau (1954)
 The Missing Miniature (1954)
 The Flying Classroom (1954)
 Holiday in Tyrol (1956)
 The Last Ones Shall Be First (1957)
 You Don't Shoot at Angels (1960)
 Love Has to Be Learned (1963)
 Don't Get Angry (1972)

References

Bibliography
 Goble, Alan. The Complete Index to Literary Sources in Film. Walter de Gruyter, 1999.

External links

1899 births
1983 deaths
People from Liberec District
Austrian male film actors
Austrian male television actors
German Bohemian people